Amit Lang (born 12 October 1970) is the CEO of Mekorot, the national water company of the State of Israel. Before this appointment, he served in senior positions in the government and private sectors. Lang is a former Olympic athlete in judo and an Israel judo champion.

Biography 
In 1987, he won the under 18 world championship in Guttenberg, and in 1990 he won the bronze medal in the European Judo Championships and seventh place in the World Judo Championships. He participated in the 1992 Olympic Games. in the past, he was an Israeli judoka. He competed in the men's lightweight event at the 1992 Summer Olympics. His highest achievement as an adult came in 1995, when he won fifth place in the European Judo Championships in Birmingham and a bronze medal in the British Open Judo Championship.

Lang began his academic studies following his retirement from judo, earning a B.A. in economics and management from the Academic College of Tel Aviv-Yaffo, an M.A. in economics and public policy from Tel Aviv University and an MBA with a major in finance from the College of Management Academic Studies.

From 1999 to 2010, Lang worked in the Budget Department of the Ministry of Finance, where his last position was deputy director of budgets. From 2010 to 2013, Lang served as deputy CEO, of economics, business development, regulation, and operator relations at Partner Communications Ltd. Lang returned to public service to serve as director general of the Ministry of Economy from 2013-2017.

In 2018-2022, Land served as CEO of EMS Mekorot Projects Ltd., a wholly-owned subsidiary of Mekorot National Water Company Ltd. In April 2022, Lang was appointed CEO of Mekorot. During his term, Mekorot has been recognized as one of the 60 best water companies in the world by Global Water Intelligence (GWI).

Achievements

References

External links
 
 
 

1970 births
Living people
Israeli male judoka
Olympic judoka of Israel
Judoka at the 1992 Summer Olympics